Andreas Tsipas (born 1904, Patele, Ottoman Empire (today Agios Panteleimonas, near Florina, Greece) – died 1956, Bitola, SFRY (present-day Republic of North Macedonia) was a Greek Communist  leader during the Second World War.

In 1933, he became a leader of the IMRO (United) in Greek Macedonia and member of the Central Committee of the Communist Party of Greece (KKE). He was a KKE candidate in the last pre-war Greek legislative elections in 1936. Between 1936 and 1941, he was imprisoned in the Acronauplia prison by political reasons. On 30 June 1941, Tzipas was one of 27 communist prisoners released from the Acronauplia at the request of the Bulgarian embassy in Athens with the intercession of Bulgarian Club in Thessaloniki, which had made representations to the German occupation authorities. Most members of the group belonged to the Slavic Macedonian community of northern Greece, which was regarded as Bulgarian by the Bulgarian authorities. With the permission from the  leader of KKE Giannis Ioannides to reconstruct the Greek Communist Party, they all declared Bulgarian ethnicity.

Some merely pretended to be a Bulgarian in order to be set free, such as Kostas Lazaridis who was a Pontic Greek, Andreas Tzimas a Greek Vlach, Petros Kentros of Arvanite and Vlach descent, etc.

After his release, Tsipas and others set about reorganising the decimated KKE. Along with Andreas Tzimas and Kostas Lazaridis, also released from prison, and Petros Rousos, Pandelis Karankitzis and Chrysa Hatzivasileiou constituted themselves as a new central committee, with Tsipas as secretary, at a meeting in July 1941, subsequently named as the VI Plenum by the KKE. This new central committee succeeded in winning the recognition of the "old central committee" and the "provisional leadership" wings of the party. 

At the VII Plenum of the central committee, held the following September, Tsipas was relieved of his post owing to "political unreliability". Tsipas was careless in security terms and abused alcohol. One account claims that after running up a bill in a bar, he sent the barman to the secret meeting place of the politburo, where someone was expected to pay his bill. After the removal from his post, he was isolated, and in January 1942, he sought refuge in Sofia, where he remained for eight months. According to some sources then he was an agent of the Bulgarian secret service.

During the Greek Civil War, he was active in the National Liberation Front (NOF) working as a nurse. After the defeat of the Democratic Army of Greece, he fled to SFRY in the Socialist Republic of Macedonia, in the city of Bitola, where he died in 1956, suffering from alcoholism.

Notes

References
 Matthias Esche, Die Kommunistische Partei Griechenlands 1941-1949, Munich: Oldenbourg, 1982. 
 Hagen Fleischer, Im Kreuzschatten der Mächte Griechenland 1941-1944 (Okkupation-Resistance-Kollaboration), Frankfurt am Main: Peter Lang, 1986, p. 591. 

1904 births
1956 deaths
People from Amyntaio
Slavic speakers of Greek Macedonia
General Secretaries of the Communist Party of Greece
Internal Macedonian Revolutionary Organization (United) members
Date of birth missing
Date of death missing